Rogersville (originally Rogerville) is a civil parish in Northumberland County, New Brunswick, Canada.

For governance purposes it is divided between the village of Nouvelle-Arcadie and the Greater Miramichi rural district, which are members of the Kent Regional Service Commission and Greater Miramichi RSC respectively.

Prior to the 2023 governance reform, the parish was divided between the village of Rogersville and the local service districts of Collette and the parish of Rogersville. Rogersville and Collette became part of Nouvelle-Arcadie while the parish LSD was split between the new village and the rural district.

Origin of name
The parish was named in honour of James Rogers, then Bishop of Chatham.

History
Rogersville was erected in 1881 from Nelson Parish.

The parish was expanded northeastward in 1900 to take in the Rosaireville area of Glenelg Parish.

Boundaries
Rogersville Parish is bounded:

 on the northwest, by a line beginning at a point about 2.25 kilometres west of North Lake and seven miles (11.27 kilometres) from the Kent County line, then running northeasterly parallel to the county line at a distance of seven miles until it strikes the southeasterly prolongation of the northeastern line of a grant to Thomas McCallum, which begins at a cove northeasterly of the junction of Rasche Street and St. Patrick's Drive in Miramichi, then southeasterly along the McCallum prolongation until it strikes the northern line of a grant to John Townley at the mouth of Big Hovel Brook, about 1.8 kilometres north of Route 440 and about 2.6 kilometres east of East Collette Villa Laplatte Road, then northeasterly along the Townley grant to the Bay du Vin River, then downstream to the eastern line of the Richard Settlement grants, which run along a north-south section of Route 440 north of Richard-Village, then southeasterly along the tier and its prolongation to the county line;
 on the southeast by the county line;
 on the southwest by a line beginning on the county line at a point about 900 metres southwest of Despres Lake, then running north 22º west through the mouth of the Renous River.

Evolution of boundaries
When Rogersville was erected it included all of Nelson Parish within seven miles (11.27 kilometres) of the Kent County line.

In 1900 all of Glenelg Parish south of the Bay du Vin River as far east as the tier of grants along Route 440 was transferred to Rogersville, adding Rosaireville and the Richard Settlement east of it.

Communities
Communities at least partly within the parish. bold indicates an incorporated municipality; italics indicate a name no longer in official use

  Collette
 East Collette
 Lakeland
 Marcelville
  Murray Settlement
 North Rogersville
 Pleasant Ridge
  Rogersville
  Rosaireville
 Sapin-Court
 Shediac Ridge
 Vienneau
 West Collette
 Young Ridge

Bodies of water
Bodies of water at least partly within the parish.
 Barnaby River
 Bay du Vin River
 Despres Lake
 North Lake
 North Branch Lake

Other notable places
Parks, historic sites, and other noteworthy places at least partly within the parish.
 West Collette Wildlife Management Area

Demographics
Parish population total does not include portion within the village of Rogersville

Population
Population trend

Language
Mother tongue (2016)

See also
List of parishes in New Brunswick

Notes

References

External links
 The Greater Region of Rogersville

Local service districts of Northumberland County, New Brunswick
Parishes of Northumberland County, New Brunswick